Chapultenango is a town and one of the 119 Municipalities of Chiapas, in southern Mexico. It covers an area of 161.5 km².

As of 2010, the municipality had a total population of 7,332, up from 6,965 as of 2005.

As of 2010, the town of Chapultenango had a population of 3,129. Other than the town of Chapultenango, the municipality had 34 localities, none of which had a population over 1,000.

References

Municipalities of Chiapas